The 4th Standing Committee of the Supreme People's Assembly (SPA) was elected by the 1st Session of the 4th Supreme People's Assembly on 16 December 1967. It was replaced on 28 December 1972 by the 5th SPA Standing Committee and the 5th Central People's Committee.

Members

References

Citations

Bibliography
Books:
 

4th Supreme People's Assembly
Presidium of the Supreme People's Assembly
1967 establishments in North Korea
1972 disestablishments in North Korea